A Climber's Guide to the Teton Range is a mountain guide by Leigh N. Ortenburger and Reynold G. Jackson. The third edition was published in 1996 by The Mountaineers of Seattle, Washington. The book details the approaches and routes to hundreds of climbs in the Teton Range, most of which are in Grand Teton National Park in Wyoming. It is a comprehensive guide to climbing in the region and includes background material including the climate, geology, and climbing history of the Teton Range.

Cited references

1996 non-fiction books
Mountaineering books
American travel books
Collaborative non-fiction books